Lecanora compallens is a species of corticolous (bark-dwelling) crustose lichen in the family Lecanoraceae. Found in Asia and Europe, it was formally described as a new species in 1999 by lichenologists Kok van Herk and André Aptroot. The type specimen was collected by the first author from Drouwenerveen (Drenthe), where it was found growing on the bark of Quercus robur. The species epithet compallens is derived from the Latin com ("together with") and (ex)pallens, alluding to the typical occurrence of the morphologically similar Lecanora expallens at the same location.

Description

The thallus of Lecanora compallens is typically  (sometimes up to 5 cm) with a whitish grey margin. It is covered with dull grayish-green warts measuring 0.1–0.2 mm in diameter. Soralia start out as point-like openings (0.1–0.3 mm in diameter) that eventually rise up and coalesce into irregular patches that ultimately cover most of the thallus, except for a 1-mm wide margin. The  are granular, and form a dense, yellowish to slightly mint green mass about 15–30 μm in diameter and forming a layer of up to 0.4 mm thick.

Zeorin and usnic acid are lichen products found in Lecanora compallens. The expected results of chemical spot tests are C−, PD−, K−, UV− in the thallus, and C−, PD−, K+ (yellowish to yellowish brown), and UV− in the soredia.

Habitat and distribution

Lecanora compallens usually grows on the west-facing side of wayside trees, on both acidic bark and neutral bark. It is often found on pedunculate oak, but has also been recorded ash, poplar, willow, Sorbus, linden, elm, and elder. Other lichens that commonly co-occur include Buellia griseovirens, Lecanora chlarotera, Pyrrhospora quernea, and Lecanora expallens; the latter species, however, usually occurs on the sheltered east side of trees. Lecanora compallens has been verified to occur in Belgium, Germany, Luxembourg, the Netherlands, Great Britain, Poland, Belarus, Russia, and Turkey.

See also

List of Lecanora species

References

compallens

Lichen species

Lichens described in 1999

Lichens of Central Europe

Lichens of Eastern Europe

Lichens of Northern Europe

Lichens of Western Asia

Taxa named by André Aptroot